The Epic Archive, Vol. 1 (1975–1979) is a compilation album by American rock band Cheap Trick, which was released digitally by Epic in 2015. In 2017, the compilation was released by Real Gone Music on CD and vinyl, the latter format being a limited edition release for Record Store Day.

The compilation has eighteen tracks spanning from 1975 to 1979, including demos, live recordings, early studio recordings of later released songs and alternate versions. The liner notes of the 2017 Real Gone Music release include quotes on the tracks from drummer Bun E. Carlos, as well as photographs of the band taken by Robert Alford.

Critical reception

Mark Deming of AllMusic felt the compilation was a "powerful reminder of just how good Cheap Trick were in the '70s". He concluded, "Given the hodgepodge of material here, [it] is best recommended to loyal fans rather than casual admirers, but anyone who hears this will be hearing a great, original rock band during a time when they were firing on all cylinders."

Track listing

Track 14 is omitted from the digital version of the album.

References

Cheap Trick compilation albums
2015 compilation albums
Epic Records compilation albums